Mora or  is a census-designated place in, and the county seat of, Mora County, New Mexico. It is located about halfway between Las Vegas and Taos on Highway 518, at an altitude of 7,180 feet. The Republic of Texas performed a semi-official raid on Mora in 1843. Two short battles of the Mexican–American War were fought in Mora in 1847, where U.S. troops eventually defeated the Hispano and Puebloan militia, effectively ending the Taos Revolt in the Mora Valley. The latter battle destroyed most of the community, necessitating its re-establishment.

Mora includes three plazas and four settlements: Mora proper, Cleveland (originally named San Antonio), Chacon, and Holman (without a plaza, and originally named Agua Negra) lying between Chacon and Cleveland. In the mid-19th century, there were two settlements, Upper and Lower Mora.

Demographics

History

Early settlement of the area 

Spanish settlers had sporadically occupied what is now known as the Mora Valley since the late 18th century.

However, Mora was formally founded as a Hispanic farming community – after Mexican independence from Spain – upon a land grant issued September 28, 1835, by Centralist Republic of Mexico Governor of Nuevo Mexico Albino Pérez, It provided title to a strip of Mora Valley land to each of dozens of families willing to settle there. Despite fanciful stories about subsistence on berries (mora means 'mulberry' in Spanish), the valley, the river, the town, and eventually the county appear to have taken their name from the family name Mora, borne by several of the settlers. While mulberry trees are found in the area, they are not native to the Americas and thus were brought by Spanish or later settlers.

The whole eastern half of New Mexico was claimed by the breakaway Republic of Texas in 1836, but was not occupied by American troops until the arrival of Stephen W. Kearny and his Army of the West in 1846.

The town 
The settlement, of Hispanos from elsewhere in New Mexico and local Puebloans, was well established by 1843, when there was a raid on the town by freebooters from the Republic of Texas under Colonel Charles A. Warfield claiming that the people in Mora had purchased stolen Texan cattle from the Comanche. The Texans killed five men and took eighteen women and children captive, as well as 75 horses. The people of the Mora Valley convened a posse, overtook the Texans, and sent them back to Texas on foot.

Mora was subject to occupying United States control under the U.S. provisional government of New Mexico beginning in 1846, during the Mexican–American war. The town, then consisting of the two settlements of Upper and Lower Mora, (sometimes misspelled "Moro" in American documents of the era) was the site of two armed conflicts between United States Army troops and a militia of Hispano and Puebloan Mexican-nationalists, in the Taos Revolt, a guerrilla campaign of the war. In the First Battle of Mora, on January 24, 1847, a group of over 150 New Mexican resistance fighters repelled an expedition of 80 US Army troops, and killed their commander, Captain Israel R. Hendley, and several others. On February 1, Capt. Jesse I. Morin and his 200 men, with artillery, destroyed the village and surrounding ranches and crops, in retaliation. This sent surviving combatant and civilian residents of Mora and its environs fleeing into and over the mountains to other settlements. The town was rebuilt some time later, after crops could be re-established. This destruction has made historical and genealogical research on Mora difficult beyond 1848, because most early records went up in flames with the buildings.

The entire war ended February 3, 1848, with all of New Mexico then under official US control, as the Mexican Cession of the Treaty of Guadalupe Hidalgo relinquished all claims by Mexico to lands north of the Rio Grande. The New Mexico Territory was formalized by the Compromise of 1850. The US Army controversially built Fort Union in 1851 on private Mora Grant land in the valley, along the Santa Fe Trail; while this sparked decades of unresolved legal actions, local farmers sold crops to the fort, which was a new and reliable source of income to the community, and the population swelled. Ceran St. Vrain, an American veteran of the Taos Revolt (originally from St. Louis in what was then the French Upper Louisiana Territory), settled in Mora in 1853; he built a grist mill, and became a major supplier of flour, grain, and fodder to the fort. The ruins of St. Vrain's mill still sit one block north of Mora's main street.

The county of Mora was established in the territory on February 1, 1860. Mora continued to grow as an agricultural community; by the late 19th century, there were five mills operating in Mora, though Fort Union, after being rebuilt for a second time, was finally closed in 1891. The population peaked around 1920, declined markedly for several decades, then stabilized in the 1970s. It remains about 80% hispanic.

Notable people
 Floyd Esquibel, member of the Wyoming Senate and former member of the Wyoming House of Representatives, was born in Mora on August 27, 1938.
 Ceran St. Vrain (1802 - 1870), a trapper and successful trader, who later became a military volunteer unit leader against the Taos Revolt. He moved to Mora in 1855 to open a grain mill, and later started one of Northern New Mexico's first English-language newspapers, the Santa Fe Gazette. He died in Mora in 1870, and had a funeral attended by over 2000, including the Fort Union garrison.
 Abraham Ledoux (1784-1842) and Antoine Ledoux (1779 - ?), two French brothers born in Québec, who became trappers and settled in Mora, New Mexico and Taos, New Mexico. The incorporated village of 'Ledoux' in Mora County and a street in Taos are named after them.

Cultural references
The settlement is mentioned in Willa Cather's 1927 historical novel Death Comes for the Archbishop (Book Two, Chapter 2), about the establishment of the Roman Catholic Archdiocese of Santa Fe.

Frank Waters's 1941 novel, People of the Valley takes place high in the Sangre de Cristo Mountains where an isolated Spanish-speaking community (based on Mora) confront a threatening world of change.

Mora was also in Louis L'Amour's 1960 Western novel The Daybreakers, in which the character Orrin Sackett is the fictional marshal of Mora.

References

Further reading

External links

Official Mora County Website

Census-designated places in New Mexico
County seats in New Mexico
Census-designated places in Mora County, New Mexico